Kirkehamn or Kirkehavn (literally: Church harbour) is a fishing village in Flekkefjord municipality in Agder county, Norway.  The village is one of two harbours on the Norwegian island Hidra.  Kirkehamn lies on the west end of the island, while the other harbour, Rasvåg lies on the south side of the island.  The village was the administrative centre of the old municipality of Hidra which existed prior to 1965.  Hidra Church is located in the village.  The village is home to about 120 residents (as of 2015).

References

Villages in Agder
Flekkefjord